North Bend is an unincorporated community in the town of North Bend, Jackson County, Wisconsin, United States.

Images

References

External links

Unincorporated communities in Jackson County, Wisconsin
Unincorporated communities in Wisconsin